Società Sportiva Dilettantistica Football Club Como Women, known as Como Women or simply Como, is an Italian football club from Como, currently playing in Serie A, the national league's top division of women football.

History 
Founded in 1991 as a section of Polisportiva Vigor Grandate, it became an independent club taking the name FCF Como 2000 in 1997. The following year Como was promoted to Serie B, and in 2001 it reached Serie A for the first time. In its debut Serie A season Como narrowly avoided relegation. Ending tied on points with second-to-last ACF Gravina, a play-off had to be played, which Como won 3–2. The team improved the next season, ranking 10th, seven points above the relegation zone. However in 2004 the team earned just 13 points and was relegated.

The return to the second category was not easy with FCF Como narrowly avoiding the relegation play-off. Como gradually consolidated at the lower level and from 2009 it began challenging for promotion with a third place finish. After a disappointing 2010 season, in 2011 Como tied at the top of the table with ACF Milan. A play-off determined which team promoted, which Milan won 0–1. However, in August ASD Reggiana was excluded from Serie A and Como was chosen to take its place.

In 2016–17 Como returned to Serie A. A poor start to the season meant that after two matches they replaced the coach Dolores Prestifilippo with Giuseppe Gerosa.

Players

Current squad

Former players

Year by year

 1991 - 4 - 2nd (Gr.A)
 1992 - 3 - 12th
 1993 - 3 - 13th [R]
 1994 - 4 - 1st (Gr.A) [P]
 1995 - 3 - 6th
 1996 - 3 - 12th
 1997 - 3 - 5th
 1998 - 3 - 1st [P]
 1999 - 2 - 4th (Gr.A)
 2000 - 2 - 2nd (Gr.A)
 2001 - 2 - 1st (Gr.A) [P]
 2002 - 1 - 12th
 2003 - 1 - 10th
 2004 - 1 - 13th [R]
 2005 - 2 - 9th (Gr.A)
 2006 - 2 - 8th (Gr.A)
 2007 - 2 - 4th (Gr.A)
 2008 - 2 - 6th (Gr.A)
 2009 - 2 - 3rd (Gr.A)
 2010 - 2 - 7th (Gr.A)
 2011 - 2 - 2nd (Gr.A) [P]
 2012 - 1 -

References

Como
Sport in Lombardy
1991 establishments in Italy